Goodwine is an English surname. Notable people with the surname include:

Hildred Goodwine (1918–1998), American artist, sculptor and illustrator
John W. Goodwine (1879–1934), American politician
Marquetta Goodwine, American writer and performance artist

English-language surnames